USS Fresno (LST-1182) was the fourth tank landing ship (LST) of the . Fresno was named for a county in California. The vessel was constructed by the National Steel and Shipbuilding Company in San Diego, California and launched in 1968. The ship entered service in 1969 and was assigned to the United States Pacific Fleet, taking part in training along the west coast and operational cruises to the western Pacific, taking part in the Vietnam War. Fresno was decommissioned in 1993 and laid up. The LST was nearly sold to Peru but remained in the U.S. inventory until 2014, when Fresno was sunk as a target ship in the Pacific Ocean during a training exercise off Guam.

Design and description
However, the traditional bow door form for LSTs would not be capable. Therefore, the designers of the Newport class came up with a design of a traditional ship hull with a  aluminum ramp slung over the bow supported by two derrick arms. This made the Newport class the first to depart from the standard LST design that had been developed in early World War II.

Fresno was fitted with six Alco 16-645-ES diesel engines turning two shafts, three to each shaft. The ship was also equipped with a bow thruster to allow for better maneuvering near causeways and to hold position while offshore during the unloading of amphibious vehicles.

The Newport class were larger and faster than previous LSTs and were able to transport tanks, heavy vehicles and engineer groups and supplies that were too large for helicopters or smaller landing craft to carry. The LSTs have a ramp forward of the superstructure that connects the lower tank deck with the main deck and a passage large enough to allow access to the parking area amidships. The vessels are also equipped with a stern gate to allow the unloading of amphibious vehicles directly into the water or to unload onto a utility landing craft (LCU) or pier. At either end of the tank deck there is a  turntable that permits vehicles to turn around without having to reverse. The vessels also have davits for four vehicle and personnel landing craft (LCVPs) and could carry four pontoon causeway sections along the sides of the hull.

Fresno was initially armed with four Mark 33 /50 caliber guns in two twin turrets. The vessel was equipped with two Mk 63 gun control fire systems (GCFS) for the 3-inch guns, but these were removed in 1977–1978. The ship also had SPS-10 surface search radar. Atop the stern gate, the vessels mounted a helicopter deck. They had a maximum complement of 213 including 11 officers.

Construction and career
The LST was ordered as part of the second group of Newport-class ships in Fiscal Year 1966 on 15 July 1966 and was laid down on 16 December 1967 at San Diego, California, by the National Steel and Shipbuilding Company. Named for a county in California, Fresno was launched on 28 September 1968, sponsored by Mrs. Marilyn Hyde, the wife of the mayor of Fresno, California. The vessel was commissioned into the United States Navy on 22 November 1969.

Fresno was assigned to the Amphibious Force, Pacific Fleet, and homeported at San Diego. The LST alternated between training operations along the west coast of the United States and regular deployments to the western Pacific. The ship saw extensive service during the latter stages of the Vietnam War and earned two battle stars. Fresno was decommissioned on 8 April 1993 and was struck from the United States Naval Vessel Register on 1 December 2008. However, this Foreign Military Sales (FMS) case was never executed and the ship remained under the control of the U.S. Navy following its decommissioning.

See also
 List of ships sunk by missiles

Citations

References

 
 
 
 
 
 
 
 
 
 

 

Newport-class tank landing ships
Ships built in San Diego
1968 ships
Cold War amphibious warfare vessels of the United States
Vietnam War amphibious warfare vessels of the United States
Ships transferred from the United States Navy to the Peruvian Navy